The 1996 Belgian Masters was an invitational non-ranking snooker tournament held in Belgium in 1996. Matthew Stevens won the tournament defeating Patrick Delsemme 7–1 in the final.

Results

References

Belgian Masters
1996 in snooker
1996 in Belgian sport